18-Norabietane is a diterpene perhydrogenated phenanthrene derivative. It occurs in the mineral fichtelite.

References
 

Diterpenes
Isopropyl compounds
Phenanthrenes